Elmer James Ryan (May 26, 1907 – February 1, 1958) was a United States representative from Minnesota.

Early life and education
He was born in Rosemount, Dakota County, Minnesota, May 26, 1907. He attended the public schools, was graduated from the University of Minnesota Law School at Minneapolis in 1929, was admitted to the bar the same year and commenced practice in South St. Paul, Minnesota with Harold Stassen.

Career
He was the city attorney of South St. Paul from 1933 to 1934.

He was delegate to the Democratic National Conventions in 1936 and 1940, and was elected as a Democrat to the 74th, 75th, and 76th Congresses (January 3, 1935 – January 3, 1941). He was an unsuccessful candidate for reelection in 1940 to the 77th Congress.

He resumed the practice of law, then entered active duty in the United States Army on June 23, 1942, as a lieutenant in the Selective Service. He was promoted to captain and transferred to the Judge Advocate General’s department, later promoted to major and was discharged on October 1, 1945. He again resumed the practice of law in South St. Paul

He died in an automobile accident on Wisconsin Highway 35, five miles north of Somerset, Wisconsin, February 1, 1958; he was interred in St. Joseph's Cemetery (Rosemount, Minnesota).

He had been married to Elenore Ford (daughter of Joseph Moravec and Cristine Kriz Moravec), who predeceased him, and they had two children, Elmer James Ryan and Jacque Ryan. Having lost his first wife in the birth of their second child, he later married Marjorie Fuller Ryan, with whom he had 4 sons, John Fuller Ryan, Geoffrey Fuller Ryan, Jeremy deMarsh Ryan, and Joseph deMarsh Ryan.

References

External links

 

University of Minnesota Law School alumni
1907 births
1958 deaths
Road incident deaths in Wisconsin
Democratic Party members of the United States House of Representatives from Minnesota
20th-century American politicians
People from Rosemount, Minnesota